Codeanywhere is a cross-platform cloud integrated development environment (IDE) created by Codeanywhere, Inc. Codeanywhere enables users to write, edit, collaborate, and run web development projects from a web browser or mobile device.

Codeanywhere is written in JavaScript. The editor is based on CodeMirror and uses OpenVZ containers for the development environments. Codeanywhere is platform agnostic, enabling the user to run code in Codeanywhere's environments called DevBoxes or connect to their own VMs via SSH or FTP protocol and also connect to Dropbox and Google Drive. The environment supports more than 75 programming languages, including HTML, JavaScript, Node.js, io.js PHP, Ruby, Python, and Go.

In 2017, the company acquired Codebender, another cloud IDE. Codebender is used to develop for Arduino devices.

History
In 2009, the predecessor to Codeanywhere, PHPanywhere, was launched. PHPanywhere was a web-based FTP client and text editor designed for PHP. That project stayed idle until May 22, 2013, when the founders launched Codeanywhere. The founders, Ivan Burazin and Vedran Jukić, reside in Split, Croatia.

Codeanywhere raised $600,000 from World Wide Web Hosting on July 15, 2013. In August 2014, Codeanywhere was accepted in Techstars's Fall Boston Class. In 2014, as part of the TechCrunch Disrupt NY Conference, the audience voted Codeanywhere the best company in Startup Alley.

In 2022 following the new trend of Cloud Developer Environments or CDEs (including GitHub Codespaces), Codeanywhere launched it's new Beta project  utilising Infrastructure as Code to relieve developers of having to configure development environments.

See also
 Online JavaScript IDE
 Integrated Development Environment

References

External links
 
 Official blog
Why Cloud IDEs Are Shifting to a Platform-as-a-Service Model

Companies based in Palo Alto, California
Technology companies established in 2013
Software companies of Croatia
Croatian brands
Online integrated development environments